Gert Kruys (born 8 May 1961 in Utrecht) is a Dutch football manager and former player. He is currently the manager of IJsselmeervogels.

Career
Kruys played his entire career for FC Utrecht (1978–1988), except for one short spell at RKC Waalwijk (1987). He retired in 1988, and soon afterwards became a coach who worked for AGOVV Apeldoorn, Cambuur Leeuwarden, FC Den Bosch, De Graafschap, FC Dordrecht and FC Volendam. After being coach of Topklasse side IJsselmeervogels, Kruys returned in professional football by becoming coach of Sparta Rotterdam on 1 January 2014. However, he was sacked on 29 November 2014.

Personal life
His son, Rick Kruys, was also a professional footballer.

References
 Profile 
 

1961 births
Living people
Dutch footballers
Dutch football managers
Association football midfielders
FC Utrecht players
RKC Waalwijk players
Eredivisie players
Eerste Divisie players
Footballers from Utrecht (city)
Eredivisie managers
SC Cambuur managers
FC Den Bosch managers
De Graafschap managers
FC Volendam managers
Sparta Rotterdam managers